Elbow pads are protective padded gear worn on the elbows to protect them against injury during a fall or a strike.

Elbow pads are worn by many athletes, especially hockey players, cyclists, roller skaters, skateboarders, volleyball players, skiers  and wrestlers.  Wrestlers sometimes use elbow pads as weapons by slapping their opponents, or take it off for an Atomic Elbow.

Soldiers also often wear elbow pads.

See also
Knee pads
Shoulder pads (sport)

References

Safety clothing
Protective gear
Armwear
Bandy equipment
Ice hockey equipment
Skateboarding equipment